Carl Schylander (1748–1811), was a Swedish stage actor.

He belonged to the elite of the pioneer generation actors of the Royal Dramatic Theatre (Dramaten). 
He was noted for his roles  in comedies.  It is as a comedian in women's roles he was most popular.  He was first employed at the Dramaten in 1787. He was also the Inspector of the Dramaten and handled its accounting. He played at the Stenborg Theater in 1790. He was married to stage actress Ebba Morman (1769  1802).  They married in 1802 shortly before her death.

References

Other sources
 Nordensvan, Georg, Svensk teater och svenska skådespelare från Gustav III till våra dagar. Förra delen, 1772–1842, Bonnier, Stockholm, 1917

1748 births
1811 deaths
18th-century Swedish male actors
19th-century Swedish male actors
Swedish male stage actors